Three provincial by-elections were held in Nova Scotia to fill vacancies in the House of Assembly.

Glace Bay 

The district of Glace Bay was vacated by Liberal Party MNA Dave Wilson; Geoff MacLellan won the election to replace him on June 22, 2010.

 
|NDP
|Myrtle Campbell
|align="right"|2281
|align="right"|31.52
|align="right"|
 
|PC
|Michelle Wheelhouse
|align="right"|759
|align="right"|10.48
|align="right"|
 
|Independent
|Edna Lee
|align="right"|195
|align="right"|2.69
|align="right"|

Yarmouth 

The district of Yarmouth was vacated by Liberal Party MNA Richard Hurlburt; Zach Churchill won the election to replace him on June 22, 2010.

 
|Progressive Conservative
|Charles Crosby
|align="right"|2628
|align="right"|33.41
|align="right"|-27.93
 
|Independent
|Belle Hatfield
|align="right"|673
|align="right"|8.56
|align="right"|Ø
 
|New Democratic Party
|John Deveau
|align="right"|513
|align="right"|6.52
|align="right"|-16.41

|}

Cumberland South 

The district of Cumberland South was vacated by Progressive Conservative MNA Murray Scott; Jamie Baillie won the election to replace him on October 26, 2010.

|-
 
|Progressive Conservative
|Jamie Baillie
|align="right"|3,262
|align="right"|57.20%
|align="right"|

 
|New Democratic Party
|Scott McKee
|align="right"|276
|align="right"|4.84%
|align="right"|
|}

2010 elections in Canada
Elections in Nova Scotia
Provincial by-elections in Nova Scotia
2010 in Nova Scotia